Lunden or Lundén is a surname. Notable people with the surname include:

Britt Strandberg (later Lundén, born 1934), Swedish cross-country skier
Camilla Lundén (born 1967), Swedish actress
Eldrid Lunden (born 1940), Norwegian poet and Norway's first professor in creative writing
Humbert Lundén (1882–1961), Swedish sailor 
Joan Lunden (born 1950), American journalist, author and television host
Jonas Lundén (born 1980), Swedish football player 
Josh Lunden (born 1986), Canadian ice hockey player
Kåre Lunden (1930–2013), Norwegian historian
Léon de Lunden, Belgian sports shooter 
Martin Lundén (1925–2011), Swedish swimmer
Mikko Lundén, Finnish politician
Mimi Sverdrup Lunden (1894–1955), Norwegian educator
Ragnhild Lundén (born 1945), Swedish artist
René Lunden (1902–1942), Belgian bobsledder 
Sara Lunden (born 1970), Swedish singer, musician and performance artist
Siri Sverdrup Lunden (1920–2003), Norwegian linguist 
Tom Lundén (born 1950), Danish composer and music producer